Altivole is a commune with 6,122 inhabitants in the province of Treviso. In the frazione San Vito is located the Brion Cemetery, a monumental tomb designed by architect Carlo Scarpa.

See also 
Brion Cemetery

References

External links 

Cities and towns in Veneto